Kittu Puttu is a 1977 Indian Kannada-language comedy drama film directed by  C. V. Rajendran and produced by Dwarakish. The film stars Vishnuvardhan, Dwarakish, Manjula, K. Vijaya and Vaishali Kasaravalli. The film was widely appreciated for its songs and story upon release. The songs tuned by Rajan–Nagendra were huge hits.

The movie is a remake of 1967 Tamil movie Anubavi Raja Anubavi which was also earlier remade in Hindi in 1973 as Do Phool. Kittu Puttu went on to also inspire the 1993 Hindi movie Aankhen.

The dual role played by Nagesh was reprised by Mehmood in the Hindi version and by Dwarakish in the Kannada version. Earlier, the triple role played by Nagesh in Panakkara Kudumbam was reprised by Mehmood in the Hindi version (Humjoli) and by Dwarakish in the Kannada version (Bhale Huduga).

Cast 
 Vishnuvardhan as Kittu
 Dwarakish as Puttu and Kutti (double role)
 Manjula as Roopa, Kittu's lover
 K. Vijaya as Deepa, Puttu's Lover
 Vaishali Kasaravalli as Kamali
 Lokanath as Kittu and Puttu's father
 M. P. Shankar as smuggler
 Thoogudeepa Srinivas as Kittu and Puttu's uncle 
 Tiger Prabhakar
 Jayashree as Kittu and Puttu's mother
 Narasimharaju as Roopa and Deepa's father
 Annapoornamma as Kutti's mother
 Shimoga Venkatesh

Soundtrack 
The music of the film was composed by Rajan–Nagendra and lyrics written by Chi. Udaya Shankar. The song "Nille Gowramma" and "Kaalvannu Thadeyoru" were received extremely well. The latter song was reused retaining the same lyrics and tune in the film Apthamitra (2004) by music director Gurukiran.

References

External links 
 

1977 films
1977 comedy-drama films
1970s Kannada-language films
Indian comedy-drama films
Films scored by Rajan–Nagendra
Twins in Indian films
Films directed by C. V. Rajendran
1977 comedy films
1977 drama films
Kannada remakes of Tamil films